Leanne Guinea (born 12 February 1985 in Melbourne) is an Australian slalom canoeist who competed at the international level from 2008 to 2011. She won a silver medal in the C1 event at the 2010 ICF Canoe Slalom World Championships in Tacen.

World Cup individual podiums

1 Oceania Canoe Slalom Open counting for World Cup points

References

2010 ICF Canoe Slalom World Championships 12 September 2010 C1 women's final results. - accessed 12 September 2010.

Australian female canoeists
Living people
1985 births
Medalists at the ICF Canoe Slalom World Championships
21st-century Australian women